Port of Varna (map) is the largest seaport complex in Bulgaria. Located on the Black Sea's west coast on Varna Bay, along Lake Varna and Lake Beloslav, it also comprises the outlying port of Balchik.

Overview 

There are two anchorages at Varna roadstead: summer and winter.

Two inland canals connect the sea and Port of Varna East with Lake Varna, Lake Beloslav and Port of Varna West: Channel 1 with draft 11.5 m and Channel 2 with draft 11.0 m. The canals form an island (Острова) on which a deepwater oil terminal, among other port facilities, is currently located. The depths of the ship berths and the approaches allow the handling of vessels of capacity up to 50,000 gross tons. Vessels with load over 200 m, beam over 26 m, or over 20,000 gross tons are required to pass the channels during daylight hours only. The largest vessel handled (as of 2006) is the Norwegian Dream cruise ship (220 m in length, 50,700 gross tons).

Port of Varna offers full service: loading, discharging, stevedoring, freight forwarding, storage and various intermodal services. For its approximately 40 berths, it operates 65 electric cranes and about 400 other pieces of ship, landside and warehouse port facilities. It has a well-forked railway and road network. The existing port facilities allow the handling of practically all kinds of solid bulk, break-bulk, containerized and some liquid-bulk cargoes.

Principal exports include urea, soda ash, cement, clinker, silica, fertilisers, grain, containers and ro-ro.
Principal imports are coal, metals, ores and ore concentrates, oil, phosphates, timber, molasses, containers and ro-ro.

Since 2006, Port of Varna serves as a hub for BP and German wind turbine manufacturer Saga.

In 2008, the port posted a 57% growth in overall tonnage handled, and at times in late summer it was stretched beyond capacity, due to redirected cargo from striking ports in the region and the year's record export of wheat from northeastern Bulgaria.

Future plans 

The updated general plan for the Port of Varna to 2020 was approved in 1999. Major projects for new construction, reconstruction and modernization include: a deepwater container terminal and a ro-ro terminal on the island under the Asparuhov most bridge, a grain terminal on the north shore of Lake Varna south of the Dry Port storage base, a liquid chemicals terminal and a cement and clinker terminal at Varna West, and modernization of the passenger and ro-ro terminals at Varna East.

In 2007, new plans were disclosed to relocate the container terminal from Varna East to a new larger basin on the northeastern shore of Lake Varna and to redevelop old port Varna East, located in the city centre, into a large marine attractions zone with a new cruise terminal, yacht marina, apartments, hotels, restaurants, museums, exhibitions, shopping, and other tourist facilities.

In 2008, plans were disclosed for another deepwater container terminal on the south side of the island for vessels carrying over 2500 twenty-foot equivalent units (TEU).

A liquified petroleum gas terminal is also being developed at Beloslav.

Also in 2008, discussions were resumed (suspended in 1981) for a 192 km long navigable canal Rousse–Varna connecting the lower river Danube with the Varna lakes and the Black Sea, but this enterprise is still considered economically unfeasible and utopian by many.

Other existing port terminals include the Cruise Terminal; Petrol, LesPort, and Varna Thermal Power Plant (handling oil, timber, and coal respectively); the Railroad Ferry Terminal, which is not part of the complex, is located on the south shore of Lake Beloslav opposite Varna West.

See also
 Varna
 St. Nikolai, Varna
 July Morning, a tradition among young Bulgarians that originated from Port of Varna

References

External links
 http://www.port-varna.bg/ - Port of Varna, Пристанище Варна
 https://web.archive.org/web/20060313130259/http://lifeseafarers.org/ - LIFE International Seafarers Centres-Varna
 Panorama photos of the Port of Varna Cruise Terminal, Port of Varna Yacht Club and the quay - Format: Apple QTVR

Varna
Varna
Transport in Varna, Bulgaria
Buildings and structures in Varna, Bulgaria